The 1908 New York to Paris Race was an automobile competition consisting of drivers attempting to travel from New York to Paris. This was a considerable challenge given the state of automobile technology and road infrastructure at the time. Only three of six contestants completed the course. The winner was the American team, driving a 1907 Thomas Flyer.

In 1907 the Peking to Paris automobile race had inspired an even bolder test of these new machines. The following year the course would be from New York City, USA, to Paris, France, with a planned  ship passage from Nome, Alaska, across the Bering Strait to East Cape, Siberia.

The 1908 New York to Paris Race
The race commenced in Times Square on February 12, 1908. Six cars representing four nations were at the starting line for what would become a 169-day ordeal (making it, in terms of time taken, still the longest motorsport event ever held). The nations represented in the race were Germany, France, Italy, and the United States. Three of the teams (De Dion-Bouton, Motobloc, and Sizaire-Naudin) represented France, while Germany, Italy and the US were represented by a Protos, a Zust, and a Thomas Flyer, respectively. At 11:15 AM, a gunshot signaled the start of the race. Ahead of the competitors were very few paved roads, and in many parts of the world no roads at all. Often, the teams resorted to straddling locomotive rails with their cars riding tie to tie on balloon tires for hundreds of miles when no roads could be found.

The American Thomas Flyer was in the lead after crossing the United States and arriving in San Francisco in 41 days, 8 hours, and 15 minutes.  It was the first crossing of the US by an automobile in winter.

The route then took them to Valdez, Alaska, by ship. The Thomas Flyer crew found impossible conditions in Alaska and the race was rerouted across the Pacific by steamer to Japan where the Americans made their way across to the Sea of Japan. Then it was on to Vladivostok, Siberia, by ship to begin crossing the continents of Asia and Europe. Only three of the competitors made it past Vladivostok: the Protos, the Züst, and the Thomas Flyer.

The wet plains of Siberia and Manchuria during the spring thaw made progress difficult. At several points, forward movement was often measured in feet rather than miles per hour. Eventually, the roads improved as Europe approached and the Thomas Flyer arrived in Paris on July 30, 1908, to win, having covered approx 16,700 km. The Germans, driven by Hans Koeppen, arrived in Paris four days earlier, but had been penalized a total of 30 days for not going through Japan and for shipping the Protos part of the way by railcar. That gave the win to the Americans with George Schuster (the only American to go the full distance from New York to Paris) by 26 days (still the largest winning margin in any motorsport event ever). The Italians arrived later in September 1908.

The race was of international interest with daily front page coverage by The New York Times (a cosponsor of the race with the Parisian newspaper Le Matin). The significance of the event extended far beyond the race itself. Together with the Peking to Paris race which took place the year before it established the reliability of the automobile as a dependable means of transportation, eventually taking the automobile from an amusement of the rich to a reliable and viable means of long distance transportation for the masses. It also led to the call for improved roads to be constructed in many parts of the world.

The winning driver George Schuster was inducted into the Automotive Hall of Fame on October 12, 2010.

The winning Thomas Flyer is on display in Reno, Nevada, at the National Automobile Museum, alongside the trophy.

World Race 2011

While the planned Great Race 2008 was cancelled as the approval and permits to travel through China were recalled, a second effort was mounted in 2011.  World Race 2011 began in Times Square April 14, 2011, as competitors set out to retrace the route taken in 1908 from New York to Paris. Ultimately, four of the starting vehicles, the oldest being a 1929 Ford Model A, a 1932 Ford 3 Window Coupe, the 1967 Volkswagen Beetle, and a 2007 Chevrolet multi-fueled Corvette, reached the Eiffel Tower in Paris on July 21, 2011. Participating in the 2011 race was Jeff Mahl, the great-grandson of George Schuster, the winning driver of the 1908 New York to Paris Race.

In popular culture 
 The 1908 movie Mishaps of the New York–Paris Race, directed by Georges Méliès, was inspired by the race.
 The 1965 movie The Great Race was loosely inspired by the 1908 New York to Paris Race, though heavily fictionalized for comedy.
 The 2008 TV documentary The Greatest Auto Race on Earth encompasses the epic story of the 1908 New York to Paris Race in vivid detail.
 Wolfgang Ettlich (Dir.): Hat der Motor eine Seele? 1908 im Auto um die Welt. (D, 2008, German) 86 min. (Does an engine have a soul? Around the world by car in 1908.)
 The June 2, 2014 Episode of Futility Closet podcast focuses on this race.
 Episode 323 of American podcast The Dollop focuses on the New York to Paris Race.
 Episode 503 of Suspense radio show "Around the World", broadcast on April 6, 1953.
 2017 fictional novel, The Perils of Paulie, written by Katie MacAlister, was published featuring a reality TV show that recreated the race using restored versions of the original cars.
 2021 episodes 8 and 9 of The Buffalo History Museum Podcast "The 1908 New York to Paris Race, Parts I & II" written by Lindsey Lauren Visser focus on the 1908 New York to Paris Car Race.

See also
 Harriet White Fisher, first person to complete a full drive around the world.

Notes

Literature
 London Daily Mail, various articles during 1907 and 1908.
  "New York to Paris Auto Race Route", in New York Times, various articles during 1907 and 1908.
 The Story of the New York to Paris Race, 1908, E.R.Thomas Motor Co., Buffalo, NY (reprinted by Floyd Clymer, Los Angeles, 1951 and Intrepid Publishing Co., 1992 ).
 
 
 
  (revised edition 1977)
  (ASIN B006Z2ERIS)

Sources

 The Great Auto Race.
 National Automobile Museum

External links
 New York Heritage - New York to Paris Race

New York to Paris Race
New York to Paris Race
New York to Paris Race
Motorsport in Europe
Motorsport in Asia
Motorsport in North America
New York to Paris Race